Stelio William Karrys (June 20, 1924 – July 12, 1997) was a Canadian football player who played for the Toronto Argonauts and Ottawa Rough Riders. He won the Grey Cup with Toronto in 1945, 1946, and 1952. He also attended and played football at the University of Toronto. He worked in his family business, Karrys Brothers Corp., a tobacco and convenience-distribution business started by his father. He died in 1997.

References

1924 births
1997 deaths
Ottawa Rough Riders players
Players of Canadian football from Quebec
Canadian football people from Montreal
Toronto Argonauts players
Toronto Varsity Blues football players